Porto Judeu is a freguesia ("parish") in the municipality of Angra do Heroísmo on the island of Terceira in the Azores. The population in 2011 was 2,501, in an area of 30.27 km2. It contains the localities Banda da Canada, Cruz, Cruz do Canário, Porto Judeu de Baixo, Porto Judeu de Cima, Refugo and Ribeira do Testo.

In Portuguese, Porto Judeu means "Jewish Port". In the past other common names were Porto Judeu de Santo António ("Jewish Port of Saint Anthony") and Porto do Judeu ("Port of the Jew").

Notable People 
Peter Francisco - American patriot and soldier in the American Revolutionary War

References

Freguesias of Angra do Heroísmo